Stirling Castle was launched in 1829. She wrecked in 1836 on Eliza Reef on passage from Sydney for Singapore and Manila.

Career
Stirling Castle enters Lloyd's Register in 1830 with Fraser, Master, and Abrams & Co., owners, and trade Greenock–Quebec.

Before her fateful voyage, Stirling Castle had sailed from Greenock, Scotland, to the colony of Sydney in 1831 with John Dunmore Lang's "mechanics" with the intention of building the Australian College and the founding members of the Sydney Mechanics' School of Arts. On the trip the mechanics set up a university to teach one another the trade and skills each one had. One family that was on board this trip was the Petrie family that became a prominent Queensland family after arriving in Moreton Bay penal settlement in 1837.

Loss
In 1836, Stirling Castle was under the command of Captain James Fraser. She ran aground on 25 May 1836 on the Swain Reefs (near present-day Rockhampton, Queensland) while travelling from Sydney to Singapore. The surviving members of the crew, including Fraser and his wife Eliza, managed to journey to the nearby Fraser Island (which at that time was known as Great Sandy Island) where they camped for several days before being taken into the camps of the local Butchulla people, the local group of Aboriginal people. James Fraser died while in their captivity (accounts differ as to whether he died due to starvation, or as a result of being speared), however, Eliza Fraser and some members of the crew subsisted among the Aborigines for seven weeks and were later rescued by a Lt. Charles Otter. Lloyd's List reported on 14 March 1837 that Stirling Castle, Fraser (late), master, had been totally lost on Eliza Reef.

Eliza Fraser later returned to England where her services as a storyteller proved to be very much in demand and became a celebrity due to her ordeal. As a result of her association with Great Sandy Island, it was by the 1880s known as Fraser Island, though it is still known as K'gari by the Butchulla.

Notes, citations, and references
Notes

Citations

References
Alexander, Michael, Mrs Fraser on the Fatal Shore (Michael Joseph, 1971)

Shipwrecks of Queensland
Brigs of Australia
1829 ships
Maritime incidents in May 1836